Final results for the water polo tournament at the 1920 Summer Olympics. All medals were decided by using the Bergvall system.

Squads

Medal summary

Results

Gold medal round

Silver medal round

Bronze medal round

Notes

References

Sources
 PDF documents in the LA84 Foundation Digital Library:
 Official Report of the 1920 Olympic Games (download, archive) (p. 130)
 Water polo on the Olympedia website
 Water polo at the 1920 Summer Olympics (men's tournament)
 Water polo on the Sports Reference website
 Water polo at the 1920 Summer Games (men's tournament) (archived)

 
1920 Summer Olympics events
1920
1920 in water polo